Hepatica  is a genus of moths of the family Noctuidae. The genus was described by Staudinger in 1892.

Species
Some species of this genus are:
Hepatica anceps Staudinger, 1892 (from south-eastern Siberia)
Hepatica aurantia de Joannis, 1930 (from Vietnam)
Hepatica bhagha (Swinhoe, 1917) (from north-eastern Himalayas, Taiwan)
Hepatica contigua Wileman, 1915
Hepatica doda (Swinhoe, 1902) Peninsular Malaysia, Borneo
Hepatica duplicilinea (Hampson, 1895) (from Manipur)
Hepatica glaucescens (Hampson, 1895) (from Sikkim)
Hepatica irrorata (Wileman & South, 1917) (from north-eastern Himalayas, Taiwan, Borneo)
Hepatica linealis (Leech, 1889) (from Japan)
Hepatica nakatanii Sugi, 1982 (from Japan)
Hepatica opalina Butler, 1879
Hepatica orbicularis Holloway, 2005 (from Borneo)
Hepatica oxydata (Hampson, 1898) {from India}
Hepatica seinoi Sugi, 1982 (from Japan)
Hepatica tarmanni Kobes, 1983

References

Calpinae